Decontrol is the third EP of the punk band Discharge. It was released on Clay Records in 1980.

Track listing
All tracks written by Discharge
"Decontrol"
"It's No T.V. Sketch"
"Tomorrow Belongs to Us"

References

Discharge (band) EPs
1980 EPs
Albums produced by Mike "Clay" Stone